Leonard Greenwood may refer to:

Leonard Greenwood (classicist) (1880–1965), New Zealander classical scholar
Leonard Greenwood (cricketer) (1899–1982), English cricketer and schoolteacher